Marc A. Feigen is an American business executive. As the CEO of Feigen Advisors, he primarily advises CEOs in the Fortune 200, while training and educating new CEOs for the chief executive role. Considered "America's leading coach for CEOs," Feigen has guided more than 35 chief executives of global companies, including Disney's Bob Iger and Ford's Mark Fields.

Feigen Advisors publishes the annual “New CEO Report,” which profiles new S&P 250 CEOs and has been cited in Fortune, HuffPost, and other news outlets. The chairman of the firm's Advisory Board is Richard Parsons, the former chairman of Citigroup and the former chairman and CEO of Time Warner.

A Harvard Business Review contributor, Feigen is quoted in The Wall Street Journal as an expert on corporate management. He is also an expert on succession planning. Feigen advocates for companies to groom and empower female CEOs, and for companies to consider co-CEOs.

In 2017, Fortune profiled Feigen's work as a CEO advisor, calling him "the CEO whisperer" and sharing five of his management lessons. The story praises Feigen for "lift[ing] the role of C-suite counselor to an entirely new dimension." That same year, Feigen appeared on Wharton Business Radio to discuss the 2016 New CEO Report. He also published an op-ed column in Investor's Business Daily explaining the report's key findings.

Background 
Feigen is a graduate of the University of Pennsylvania (B.A. with honors, History); Cambridge University, (M.Phil., International Relations); and the Harvard Business School (MBA).

Personal life 
Feigen has two daughters: Julia and Annabel.

Publications 
 "Is It Time to Consider Co-CEOs?" Harvard Business Review, 2022
 "Look to Military History for Lessons in Crisis Leadership." Harvard Business Review, 2020
 "The CEO's Guide to Retirement." Harvard Business Review, 2018
"The Boardroom's Quiet Revolution." Harvard Business Review, 2014
 "Ensuring CEO Succession Ability in the Boardroom" chapter in The Talent Management Handbook, McGraw Hill, 2011
 Real Change Leaders, Times Books, 1996

References

Living people
Date of birth missing (living people)
American consulting businesspeople
American chief executives
Harvard Business School alumni
University of Pennsylvania alumni
Year of birth missing (living people)